Valentin Mândâcanu (July 27, 1930 in Mihăileni – October 29, 2012) was a writer and politician from Republic of Moldova.

Mândâcanu was a founder of the Democratic Movement of Moldova. He was elected in 1990 election and served as member of the Parliament of Republic of Moldova (1990–1994).

Awards
 Honorary citizen Chişinău

References

External links 
 Valentin Mândâcanu, sursă de lumină şi adevăr
 Raportul Comisiei Cojocaru
 Chisinaul orasul meu
 art. "Veşmântul fiinţei noastre" (pe marginea problemelor lingvistice)
 Mandacanu, Valentin

1930 births
People from Căușeni District
Eastern Orthodox Christians from Romania
Moldova State University alumni
Moldovan writers
Moldovan male writers
Popular Front of Moldova politicians
2012 deaths
Moldovan philologists